Khalikawe or Kalikawe is a name or symbol which means "believer". It usually refers to being successor of your life, but is also used as a symbol among the Nilo-Saharan Islamic religious groups pronounced and written as "خالقالكونرعب".

Concept Lived person 
 Bongoland
 In both Buntu Tribes and Nilo-Saharan Tribes a Khalikawe is a spiritual believer of a life successor which in Swahili means mrithi.

Origin 
Khalikawe is originated from the Great Mosque of Kilwa.

Islamic belief and doctrine
Islamic terminology